Montgomery County Public Library may refer to:

Montgomery City-County Public Library, the library system of Montgomery County, Alabama
Montgomery County Public Libraries, the library system of Montgomery County, Maryland
Montgomery County Memorial Library System, a public library system in Montgomery County, Texas
Montgomery County Public Library, a branch of the Ohoopee Regional Library System in Georgia